Sabutis is the masculine form of a Lithuanian family name. Its feminine forms  are: Sabutienė (married woman or widow) and Sabutytė (unmarried woman).

Notable persons with the name Sabutis include:
Eugenijus Sabutis (born  1975)  Lithuanian politician, since 2016 Mayor of Jonava
Mindaugas Sabutis (born 1975),  Lithuanian prelate, current Primate of the Evangelical Lutheran Church in Lithuania

Lithuanian-language surnames